Frostbiter: Wrath of the Wendigo, is an independent comedy horror film, filmed sometime in 1988 but released in 1995 by Troma Entertainment. One of the stars, Ron Asheton, was the guitarist for The Stooges.

Synopsis
Two friends go hunting in the woods of Northern Michigan.  While wandering the woods, they accidentally break a sacred circle, releasing a terrible monster: the Wendigo.  The Wendigo goes on a terrible killing spree, leaving a gun-toting hero and his female love-interest to destroy the monster.

Details
The film owes a large debt to Sam Raimi's Evil Dead films with its mix of horror and comedy, in fact featuring a torn Evil Dead II poster in much the same way The Evil Dead features a torn The Hills Have Eyes poster. The film also gives "special thanks" to Bruce Campbell, the star of the Evil Dead films. This connection was reinforced in Japan, where the movie was released on video under the misleading title Shiryōnoharawata Sai Tsui Shō. Since the Japanese title of Evil Dead is Shiryōnoharawata, the distributors obviously tried to cash in on the success of Raimi's trilogy. Also, the Japanese videocassette box puts the emphasis on a creature with a skull's head, reminiscent of the original Evil Dead II poster.

At one part of the film, footage from Frank Capra's It's a Wonderful Life, with some scenes in the film claiming to take place in Bedford Falls, much like the Christmas classic.

The movie was filmed primarily in southeast Michigan, in particular on a hunting cabin set built inside an old schoolhouse in Tecumseh.

References

External links

 

1996 films
1996 horror films
1980s stop-motion animated films
Troma Entertainment films
American comedy horror films
American monster movies
American supernatural horror films
1990s comedy horror films
Wendigos in popular culture
American exploitation films
1996 comedy films
Films set in Michigan
Films based on Native American mythology
American splatter films
1990s English-language films
1980s English-language films
1990s American films